= Twelve South =

Maker of mobile device accessories

- Type: LLC
- Industry: Apple accessories
- Founded: 2009
- Founder: Andrew and Leigh Ann Green
- Headquarters: Charleston, South Carolina, United States
- Products: HiRise, BookArc, BookBook
- Number of employees: 20-25
- Website: twelvesouth.com

Twelve South is a company which produces accessories and cases for use with Apple products.

== Operation ==
Twelve South employs a small team of workers and aims to design, produce and manufacture a handful of select new accessories for Apple products every year; their motto is "We're not just Mac friendly, we're Apple only." The company was set up in 2009 by husband and wife Andrew and Leigh Ann Green in Mount Pleasant, South Carolina. They moved to Charleston, South Carolina in 2017.

In June 2012, Forbes suggested that Apple should buy both Twelve South and Apple accessory maker Mophie, not because of the profits of the two companies, but rather that the excellent products they make would bolster Apple's own profile in the accessories market.
